Tom Reeder, Jr. (born December 31, 1949, in Miami, Florida) is an American politician and a Republican member of the Wyoming House of Representatives representing District 58 since September 27, 2011, when he was appointed by the Natrona County Commission to fill the vacancy caused by the resignation of Representative Lisa Shepperson.

Education
Reeder attended Metropolitan State College, Miami Dade Junior College, the Florida Institute of Technology, and Embry–Riddle Aeronautical University.

Elections
2012 Reeder was unopposed for both the August 21, 2012 Republican Primary, winning with 735 votes, and the November 6, 2012 General election, winning with 2,439 votes.

References

External links
Official page at the Wyoming Legislature
Campaign site
 

1949 births
Living people
Embry–Riddle Aeronautical University alumni
Florida Institute of Technology alumni
Republican Party members of the Wyoming House of Representatives
Politicians from Casper, Wyoming
Politicians from Miami
Miami Dade College alumni
21st-century American politicians